The 2012–13 OHL season was the 33rd season of the Ontario Hockey League. The Mississauga St. Michael's Majors were sold during the off-season. As part of the sale, the "St. Michael's Majors" name was returned to St. Michael's College School.  The new name of the team will be the Mississauga Steelheads. The Brampton Battalion announced during the season that this would be their last season in Brampton and will relocate to North Bay, Ontario for the 2013–14 OHL season. Twenty teams played 68 games each during the regular season schedule, which began in September 2012 and ended in March 2013. The London Knights won their second consecutive J. Ross Robertson Cup and third in franchise history, and with it a berth in the 2013 Memorial Cup hosted by the Saskatoon Blades of the WHL.

Regular season

Final standings
Note: DIV = Division; GP = Games played; W = Wins; L = Losses; OTL = Overtime losses; SL = Shootout losses; GF = Goals for; GA = Goals against; PTS = Points; x = clinched playoff berth; y = clinched division title; z = clinched conference title

Eastern conference

Western conference

Scoring leaders
Note: GP = Games played; G = Goals; A = Assists; Pts = Points; PIM = Penalty minutes

Leading goaltenders
Note: GP = Games played; Mins = Minutes played; W = Wins; L = Losses: OTL = Overtime losses; SL = Shootout losses; GA = Goals Allowed; SO = Shutouts; GAA = Goals against average

Playoffs

Conference quarterfinals

Eastern conference quarterfinals

(1) Belleville Bulls vs. (8) Mississauga Steelheads

(2) Barrie Colts vs. (7) Kingston Frontenacs

(3) Oshawa Generals vs. (6) Niagara IceDogs

(4) Brampton Battalion vs. (5) Sudbury Wolves

Western conference quarterfinals

(1) London Knights vs. (8) Saginaw Spirit

(2) Plymouth Whalers vs. (7) Sarnia Sting

(3) Owen Sound Attack vs. (6) Sault Ste. Marie Greyhounds

(4) Kitchener Rangers vs. (5) Guelph Storm

Conference semifinals

Eastern conference semifinals

(1) Belleville Bulls vs. (5) Sudbury Wolves

(2) Barrie Colts vs. (3) Oshawa Generals

Western conference semifinals

(1) London Knights vs. (4) Kitchener Rangers

(2) Plymouth Whalers vs. (3) Owen Sound Attack

Conference finals

Eastern conference finals

(1) Belleville Bulls vs. (2) Barrie Colts

Western conference finals

(1) London Knights vs. (2) Plymouth Whalers

J. Ross Robertson Cup

(W1) London Knights vs. (E2) Barrie Colts

J. Ross Robertson Cup Champions Roster

Playoff scoring leaders
Note: GP = Games played; G = Goals; A = Assists; Pts = Points; PIM = Penalty minutes

Playoff leading goaltenders

Note: GP = Games played; Mins = Minutes played; W = Wins; L = Losses: OTL = Overtime losses; SL = Shootout losses; GA = Goals Allowed; SO = Shutouts; GAA = Goals against average

Awards

All-Star teams
The OHL All-Star Teams were selected by the OHL's General Managers.

First team
Vincent Trocheck, Centre, Plymouth Whalers
Reid Boucher, Left Wing, Sarnia Sting
Seth Griffith, Right Wing, London Knights
Ryan Sproul, Defence, Sault Ste. Marie Greyhounds
Scott Harrington, Defence, London Knights
Jordan Binnington, Goaltender, Owen Sound Attack
Mike Vellucci, Coach, Plymouth Whalers

Second team
Charles Sarault, Centre, Sarnia Sting
Garret Ross, Left Wing, Saginaw Spirit
Brett Ritchie, Right Wing, Niagara IceDogs
Cody Ceci, Defence, Owen Sound Attack
Ryan Murphy, Defence, Kitchener Rangers
John Gibson, Goaltender, Kitchener Rangers
George Burnett, Coach, Belleville Bulls

Third team
Boone Jenner, Centre, Oshawa Generals
Anthony Camara, Left Wing, Barrie Colts
Cameron Brace, Right Wing, Owen Sound Attack
Dylan DeMelo, Defence, Mississauga Steelheads
Colin Miller, Defence, Sault Ste. Marie Greyhounds
Malcolm Subban, Goaltender, Belleville Bulls
D. J. Smith, Coach, Oshawa Generals

2013 OHL Priority Selection
On April 6, 2013, the OHL conducted the 2013 Ontario Hockey League Priority Selection. The Ottawa 67's held the first overall pick in the draft, and selected Travis Konecny from the Elgin-Middlesex Chiefs. Konecny was awarded the Jack Ferguson Award, awarded to the top pick in the draft.

Below are the players who were selected in the first round of the 2013 Ontario Hockey League Priority Selection.

2013 NHL Entry Draft
On June 30, 2013, the National Hockey League conducted the 2013 NHL Entry Draft held at the Prudential Center in Newark, New Jersey. In total, 37 players from the Ontario Hockey League were selected in the draft. Sean Monahan of the Ottawa 67's was the first player from the OHL to be selected, as he was taken with the sixth overall pick by the Calgary Flames.

Below are the players selected from OHL teams at the NHL Entry Draft.

2013 CHL Import Draft
On July 3, 2013, the Canadian Hockey League conducted the 2013 CHL Import Draft, in which teams in all three CHL leagues participate in. The Ottawa 67's held the first pick in the draft by a team in the OHL, and selected Alex Lintuniemi from Finland with their selection.

Below are the players who were selected in the first round by Ontario Hockey League teams in the 2013 CHL Import Draft.

See also
 2013 Memorial Cup
 List of OHL seasons
 2012–13 QMJHL season
 2012–13 WHL season
 2012 in ice hockey
 2013 in ice hockey

External links
 Official website of the Ontario Hockey League
 Official website of the Canadian Hockey League
 Official website of the MasterCard Memorial Cup
 Official website of the Subway Super Series

References

Ontario Hockey League seasons
Ohl